The Girl Who Was ... Death is the debut album by Devil Doll. Its official release date was March 4, 1989, but there was a pre-release of cassette tapes in December 1988. This was the second album by Devil Doll, but their first to be released to the public (the group's first release, The Mark of the Beast, had only one copy pressed, which was owned by the leading band member, Mr. Doctor).

Background 
The album was entirely written by Mr. Doctor and is based on a television series by Patrick McGoohan called The Prisoner. The first edition of the album was pressed into 500 copies, but only 150 would survive Mr. Doctor's strange artistic vision. The 150 copies were handed out after a live performance of the album and the remaining 350 LPs were burned by Mr. Doctor after the show. In each album handed out was a unique inlay written by Mr. Doctor personally. The album was released under several different editions throughout the years—most notably by the band's official fan club, now the only source from which to obtain any of the band's material.

Music style 
Like all but two Devil Doll albums, The Girl Who Was ... Death contains only one track: the title track (another album has one musical track that is split into separate CD tracks). Being at an easily referenced length of 66 minutes and 6 seconds long, the song goes through many different themes and melodies, keeping strong to the band's progressive attributes. The album travels through several emotions with eerie tones and metaphorical lyrics. At 38:46 into the song, the music ceases and silence continues until the very end, where the album features the band's cover of the main theme from the television series that it is based on, The Prisoner. There are also some variations of this arrangement on other editions of the album, occurring during the 20-minute silence and outro.

Devil Doll continued to release several more albums in the styling of The Girl Who Was ... Death throughout the 1990s.

Track listing 

The song ends at 38 minutes 46 seconds. After 25 minutes and 25 seconds of silence, a hidden track titled "The Prisoner" begins.

Personnel

Line up 
Mr. Doctor – Vocals, Keyboards
Edoardo Beato – Piano
Albert Dorigo – Guitar
Katia Giubbilei – 2nd Violin
Rob Dani – Percussions
Bor Zuljan – Guitars
Jurij Toni – Tuba
Davor Klarič – Keyboard
Jani Hace – Bass
Lucko Kodermac – Drums
Sasha Olenjuk – 1st Violin

Guests 
Paolo Zizich – Backing vocals
Mojca Slobko – Harp
The "Devil Chorus", conducted by Marian Bunič

References

Devil Doll (Slovenian band) albums
1989 albums
Albums recorded in Slovenia